Emily Suzanne Flake (born June 16, 1977) is an American cartoonist and illustrator. Her work has appeared in The New Yorker, The New York Times, Time and many other publications. Her weekly comic strip Lulu Eightball has appeared in numerous alternative newsweeklies since 2002.

Personal life
Flake was born in Manchester, Connecticut. She now lives in Brooklyn, New York. Her influences include Winsor McCay, Harold Gray, Shel Silverstein, and Bruce Eric Kaplan

Education
She received a bachelor of fine arts in illustration from Maryland Institute College of Art in 1999.

Awards
In 2007, Flake won a Prism Award for her book These Things Ain't Gonna Smoke Themselves.

Bibliography

 
 
 Lulu Eightball Volume 2 (Atomic Book Company, 2009)
 Mama Tried: Dispatches from the Seamy Underbelly of Modern Parenting (Grand Central Publishing, 2015)
 
 
 
 
———————
Notes

References

External links 
 

American female comics artists
Living people
1977 births
The New Yorker cartoonists
American women cartoonists
People from Manchester, Connecticut
Artists from Connecticut
American cartoonists
Maryland Institute College of Art alumni
21st-century American artists
21st-century American women artists